The Interfactional Union "Eurooptimists" was an association of people's deputies (members of parliament) of the 8th convocation (2014–2019) of the Verkhovna Rada, Ukraine's unicameral parliament. It was established in Kyiv on 3 February 2015. The inter-factional group was discontinued after the 2019 Ukrainian parliamentary election.

The group aimed to promote ties between Ukraine and the European Union by reaffirming the Ukrainian Eurointegration course, and by ensuring the effective implementation of the Ukraine–EU Association Agreement and the Deep and Comprehensive Free Trade Area.

In the autumn of 2015, attempts and negotiations started to form a political party around then Governor of Odessa Oblast Mikheil Saakashvili and members of the parliamentary group "Eurooptimists", Democratic Alliance and possibly Self Reliance this projection collapsed in June 2016. In August 2016 "Eurooptimists" Svitlana Zalishchuk, Serhiy Leshchenko and Mustafa Nayyem from the Petro Poroshenko Bloc joined to Democratic Alliance instead.

Members
The Interfactional Union "Eurooptimists" consisted of 25 deputies (8 from the Petro Poroshenko Bloc, 2 from the People's Front, 6 from Self Reliance, and 5 from Fatherland and 4 non-affiliated):

References

External links

 2015-2016 report of the interfactional union "EuroOptimists" на SlideShare


Verkhovna Rada
Ukraine–European Union relations
2015 establishments in Ukraine
2019 disestablishments in Ukraine
Defunct political party alliances in Ukraine
Issue-based groups of legislators
8th Ukrainian Verkhovna Rada